The Philippine House Committee on Information and Communications Technology, or House Information and Communications Technology Committee is a standing committee of the Philippine House of Representatives.

Jurisdiction 
As prescribed by House Rules, the committee's jurisdiction includes the following:
 Any and all other public and private electronic means of capturing, processing, storing and transmitting of information for information technology
 Information systems including hardware, software and content applications
 Mobile short messaging system (SMS) applications affecting upstream and downstream business application
 Networks that enable access to online technology
 Postal, telegraph, radio, broadcast, cable television, telephone, convergence, computers and telecommunications technologies including but not limited to broadband access to wired and wireless connectivity to the internet such as voice over internet protocol (VOIP), video conferencing and audio/video/data streaming

Members, 18th Congress

See also
 House of Representatives of the Philippines
 List of Philippine House of Representatives committees
 Department of Information and Communications Technology

References

External links 
House of Representatives of the Philippines

Information
Information technology in the Philippines
Communications in the Philippines